Providence Improv Guild (PIG) is an improvisational theatre in Providence, Rhode Island. It is located in AS220 at 95 Empire Street, Providence RI, 02903.

Performances & Groups 
PIG has performances every Thursday, Friday, and Saturday night at 7 p.m. House teams perform regularly at PIG.

Improvisers from around the country and world have been featured at PIG, including performers from Chicago, New York, Arizona, California and as far as India.

PIG also maintains an open stage policy and welcomes any comedy group to visit and perform on its stage.

Classes 
PIG offers an improv curriculum with the goal of getting students confident and on stage as quickly as possible. There are four levels of classes that focus on Scene Support, Game, and Character and cumulate in the study of the classic longform improv structure the Harold (improvisation).

Specialized workshops are offered every other Saturday morning and are taught by guild teachers as well as out-of-town performers. Popular workshops have included Love the One Your With: Choosing Love in Scenes, Stop Trying to Be Funny, and Beefing up Your Show.

References

Improvisational theatre
Theatre in Rhode Island
Organizations based in Providence, Rhode Island
Education in Providence, Rhode Island